Angelo Vaccaro (born 4 October 1981) is a retired Italian footballer.

Career
Born in Tübingen, he made his debut on the professional league level in the Bundesliga for VfB Stuttgart on 2 December 2000 when came on as a substitute for Ioan Viorel Ganea in the 72nd minute of a game against Borussia Dortmund.

In the 2010–11 season, he left for Italian side Sorrento after a six-month spell in Hungary.

References

1981 births
Living people
Sportspeople from Tübingen
Italian footballers
German sportspeople of Italian descent
Italian expatriate footballers
Expatriate footballers in Germany
Bundesliga players
2. Bundesliga players
3. Liga players
Italian expatriate sportspeople in Germany
VfB Stuttgart II players
VfB Stuttgart players
SpVgg Unterhaching players
FC Augsburg players
Stuttgarter Kickers players
Eintracht Frankfurt II players
SV Elversberg players
SSV Reutlingen 05 players
FC 08 Homburg players
Expatriate footballers in Hungary
Budapest Honvéd FC players
Italian expatriate sportspeople in Hungary
Association football forwards
Footballers from Baden-Württemberg